Yashelkul (Yäşelkül) is a rural locality (a village) in Zildyarovsky Selsoviet, Miyakinsky District, Bashkortostan, Russia. The population was 2 as of 2010. There is 1 street.

Geography 
Yashelkul is located 41 km southwest of Kirgiz-Miyaki (the district's administrative centre) by road. Shatmantamak is the nearest rural locality.

References 

Rural localities in Miyakinsky District